Im Chhun Lim is a Cambodian politician. He belongs to the Cambodian People's Party and was elected to represent Kratié Province in the National Assembly of Cambodia in 2003, and serves as the country's Minister for Land Management, Urban Planning and Construction. Born in Kratie, Lim is of Chinese descent.

References

Cambodian People's Party politicians
Members of the National Assembly (Cambodia)
Government ministers of Cambodia
Living people
Year of birth missing (living people)
People from Kratié province
Cambodian politicians of Chinese descent